Fredrick Richard Kluckhorn (November 21, 1891 – November 3, 1968) was an American college football player and coach. He served as the head football coach at North Central University from 1917 to 1919, compiling a record of 13–6–1.

References

External links
 

1891 births
1968 deaths
North Central Cardinals football coaches
North Central Cardinals football players
People from Kankakee County, Illinois